William Ambrose Goggin (February 18, 1906 – August 2, 1979) was an American professional golfer. His best finish in a major championship was runner-up at the 1933 PGA Championship, won by Gene Sarazen.

In 1959, Goggin won the PGA Seniors' Championship, at Dunedin, Florida, with a score of 284, a shot ahead of the field. In June of that year faced British PGA Seniors Championship winner Arthur Lees in a match for what was billed as "the world professional senior golf title". To boost attendance, the final 18 holes of the match were scheduled to be played at night. In what the Associated Press called "the first twilight championship match on record," Goggin won the match 5&3. In December that year he also won the National Senior Open at Eldorado Country Club in a 3-way playoff, retaining the title he had won in 1958.

Tournament wins
this list is incomplete
1935 Northern California Open
1936 Northern California Open
1944 Metropolitan PGA Championship
1958 National Senior Open
1959 PGA Seniors' Championship, World Senior Championship, National Senior Open

Results in major championships

NYF = tournament not yet founded
NT = no tournament
WD = withdrew
CUT = missed the half-way cut
R64, R32, R16, QF, SF = round in which player lost in PGA Championship match play
"T" indicates a tie for a place

Summary

Most consecutive cuts made – 11 (1938 U.S. Open – 1947 PGA)
Longest streak of top-10s – 2 (twice)

References

American male golfers
PGA Tour golfers
People from Tuolumne County, California
Sportspeople from San Jose, California
1906 births
1979 deaths